In Scottish folklore the Ghillie Dhu or Gille Dubh was a solitary male fairy. He was kindly and reticent, yet sometimes wild in character. He had a gentle devotion to children. Dark-haired and clothed in leaves and moss, he lived in a birch wood within the Gairloch and Loch a Druing area of the north-west Highlands of Scotland. Ghillie Dhu is the eponym for the ghillie suit.

Etymology
Ghillie is an English equivalent of the Scottish Gaelic word ; Edward Dwelly, a Scottish lexicographer, lists gille as a "lad", "youth" or "boy" with dubh translating as "dark" or "dark-haired".

Folk beliefs

Description and common attributes
According to folklorist and scholar Katharine Briggs the Ghillie Dhu was a gentle and kind-hearted mountain spirit, or a "rather unusual nature fairy." The Ghillie Dhu was an individual male modern day fairy described by Osgood Mackenzie, a Scottish landowner and horticulturist, in his memoirs that were published in 1921. The fairy was generally timid, yet he could also be "wild".

Residing in the birch woods near Loch a Druing, in the north-west Highland area of Gairloch, he was mainly seen in the latter part of the 18th century. One summer evening a local child named Jessie Macrae wandered into the woods and became lost. Jessie was found by the Ghillie Dhu who looked after her until the next morning when he took her home. Over a period of four decades the fairy was frequently seen by many people but Jessie was the only person he conversed with. Generally of a dishevelled appearance, he used green moss and leaves taken from trees as clothing. As implied by his name, he had black hair; he was of a small stature. His fondness of children is similar to that displayed by the little known Hyter sprite of English mythology.

Attempted hunt
Shortly after the Gille Dhu rescued Jessie, a group of Mackenzie dignitaries were invited by the landowner, Sir Hector Mackenzie of Gairloch, to get together to hunt and capture the Ghillie Dhu. The team of five hunters congregated at the home of one of Mackenzie's tenants where they were provided with a complimentary evening meal before setting off on their mission to shoot the child-rescuing, kind Ghillie Dhu. Despite searching extensively throughout the night, the hunters could not find their prey; according to Patricia Monaghan, a writer on Celtic mythology, the Ghillie Dhu was never seen again.

Origins
After researching folklore traditions gathered primarily from Gaelic areas of Scotland, an authority on congenital disorders, Susan Schoon Eberly, has speculated the tale of the Ghillie Dhu may have a basis in a human being with a medical condition; other academics, such as Carole G. Silver, Professor of English at Stern College for Women, agree and suggest he was a dwarf. Eberly maintained several other solitary or individual fairies, including the Brownie and the Manx Fenodyree, could also have a medical, rather than supernatural, explanation.

See also
Ghillie suit
Dryad
Aos Sí

References
Citations

Bibliography

Fairies
Scottish legendary creatures